The Porsche Rennsport Reunion is an automotive event and the world's largest meeting of classic Porsche racing cars and their drivers. Porsche has been organising the Rennsport Reunion since 2001 to honour its own motorsport tradition. The event has been conceived by the former British racing driver Brian Redman and former Porsche Cars North America’s press spokesperson Bob Carlson.

History 
Rennsport Reunion is an event hosted since 2001 every 3 to 5 years in the United States. After the first three events were held on the east coast of the US, two events at Daytona International Speedway in Daytona Beach, Florida in 2004 and 2007 followed, before the event moved for Rennsport Reunion IV to the west coast in 2011.

Rennsport Reunion I 
The first Porsche Rennsport Reunion event was held at Lime Rock Park, Connecticut in 2001.

Rennsport Reunion II 
The Porsche Rennsport Reunion II was held at the Daytona International Speedway in 2004.

Rennsport Reunion III 
The Porsche Rennsport Reunion III was held at the Daytona International Speedway in 2007.

Rennsport Reunion IV 

The Porsche Rennsport Reunion IV was held at Laguna Seca in Monterey, California in 2011.

Rennsport Reunion V 

The Porsche Rennsport Reunion V was held at Laguna Seca in Monterey, California in 2015.

Rennsport Reunion VI 
The Porsche Rennsport Reunion VI was held at Laguna Seca in Monterey, California in September 2018 with 81,550 attendees.

Rennsport Reunion VII 
The Porsche Rennsport Reunion VII will be held at Laguna Seca in Monterey, California September 28th through October 1st, 2023.

References

External links 

Porsche in motorsport
Auto shows in the United States